The 1922 Louisiana Tech Bulldogs football team was an American football team that represented the Louisiana Polytechnic Institute—now known as Louisiana Tech University—as a member of the Louisiana Intercollegiate Athletic Association (LIAA) during the 1922 college football season. Led by first-year head coach William Henry Dietz, Louisiana Tech compiled an overall record of 5–1–1. The team's captain was Edgar L. Walker.

Schedule

References

Louisiana Tech
Louisiana Tech Bulldogs football seasons
Louisiana Tech Bulldogs football